Alan Bircher (born 21 September 1981) is a British former long-distance swimmer. After finishing a long international career he entered into coaching, following successful coaching posts at West Suffolk where he coached his wife Stefanie Bircher to the World Championships 7th-place finish (Rome 2009) and had multiple national champions. He then went on to coach at Wyre Forest Swimming Club in Worcestershire.  After a highly successful 2011/2012 season, Alan moved to his current coaching position at Ellesmere College Titans (ECTM). In 2020, he was suspended and stopped from forming part of Team GB's Tokyo coaching squad.

Bircher won two senior international medals a brace of silvers in 2004: World Championships Dubai 10 km and European Championships Madrid 5 km. He also narrowly missed out on medals in the Open Water Swimming at the 2005 / 2006 / 2007 World Aquatics Championships in the 10 km open water swim, finishing in 4th / 7th / 7th respectively.

References

 
 Ex British Swimmer Joins Titans Coaching Team

External links

1981 births
Living people
British male swimmers
Male long-distance swimmers